White Wilderness is a 1958 nature documentary film produced by Walt Disney Productions. It is noted for its propagation of the misconception of lemming mass suicide.

The film was directed by James Algar and narrated by Winston Hibler. It was filmed on location in Canada over the course of three years. It won the Academy Award for Best Documentary Feature and the Golden Bear for Best Documentary in the 1959 Berlin Film Festival.

Reception 
Howard Thompson of The New York Times wrote "Mr. Disney has assembled a fine, often fascinating color documentary on animal life in the North American Arctic". Geoffrey Warren of the Los Angeles Times stated: "Walt Disney has turned again to Nature for adventure and profit. With 'White Wilderness' the master of unusual entertainment has struck pure gold, for this is probably the best of his many true-to-life films". Variety called the film "a fascinating screen experience. Filmed in awesome detail in the icy wastes of the Arctic, where struggle for existence is savage and cruel, this feature is one of the most spectacular of Walt Disney's 'True-Life Adventure' series, and as such can expect handsome returns from its particular market". Harrison's Reports declared: "From the opening to the closing scenes, one is held enthralled by the truly remarkable shots of polar region wild life, both large and small, made all the more interesting by the fine Technicolor photography, the clever editing and the appropriate background music, which heighten both the comic and dramatic aspects of the different scenes". The Monthly Film Bulletin wrote: "The familiar music score, production tricks, anthropomorphic humours and human-angle narration are again in evidence. The basic material, however, remains enthralling; in the case of lemmings and wolverines possibly unique".

Controversy 
White Wilderness contains a scene that supposedly depicts a mass lemming migration, and ends with the lemmings leaping into the Arctic Ocean. The narrator of the film states that the lemmings are likely not committing suicide, but rather are in the course of migrating, and upon encountering a body of water are attempting to cross it. If the body of water the lemmings encounter is too wide, they can suffer exhaustion and drown as a result.

In 1982, the CBC Television news magazine program The Fifth Estate broadcast a documentary about animal cruelty in Hollywood called "Cruel Camera", focusing on White Wilderness, as well as the television program Wild Kingdom. Bob McKeown, the host of the CBC program, discovered that the lemming scene was filmed at the Bow River near Canmore, and not in the Arctic Ocean as implied by the film. McKeown interviewed a lemming expert, who claimed that the particular species of lemming shown in the film is not known to migrate, much less commit mass suicide. In fact, the lemmings were transported to the location, jostled on turntables, and thrown off a cliff after which the footage was edited. Additionally, he revealed that footage of a polar bear cub falling down an Arctic ice slope was really filmed in a Calgary film studio. It remains unknown whether or not Walt Disney was aware or approved of this practice.

In popular culture 
White Wilderness was the inspiration for the 1986 Dead Kennedys song "Potshot Heard Round the World".

The scene of lemmings leaping off a cliff in White Wilderness was used as political metaphor in a campaign ad promoting Andrew Monroe Rice, an Oklahoma candidate in the 2008 US Senate race.

A scene in the 2014 animated film Penguins of Madagascar parodies the controversy surrounding White Wilderness.

See also 
 List of American films of 1958

References

External links 
 
 
 
 
 

1958 films
English-language Canadian films
Disney documentary films
American documentary films
Canadian documentary films
Best Documentary Feature Academy Award winners
Documentary films about nature
Films directed by James Algar
Films produced by Ben Sharpsteen
Films produced by Walt Disney
Films shot in Canada
Animal cruelty incidents in film
Film controversies
Disney controversies
1958 documentary films
Films scored by Oliver Wallace
Walt Disney Pictures films
1950s English-language films
1950s American films
1950s Canadian films